Ahmadkhel District or Lazha Ahmadkhel is a district of Paktia Province, Afghanistan.

Districts of Paktia Province